Grill or grille may refer to:

Food

 Barbecue grill, a device or surface used for cooking food, usually fuelled by gas or charcoal, or the part of a cooker that performs this function
 Flattop grill, a cooking device often used in restaurants, especially diners
 George Foreman Grill, a double-sided portable electrically heated grill
Grill, a restaurant that serves grilled food, such as a "bar and grill"
 Grilling, a form of cooking that involves direct heat
Mixed grill, a combination of traditional grilled foods

Music
 Grill Music Venue, an Irish nightclub located in Letterkenny, County Donegal
 "Grillz", a 2005 rap single by Nelly
 A parody of the song by the German rap-group K.I.Z

People
 Grill family, Swedish family involved in the Swedish East India Company
 Bernhard Grill (born 1961)
 Jean Abraham Grill (1736–1792), Swedish merchant

Ships
 German aviso Grille
 SMS Grille

Other uses
 Grill (cryptology), method used chiefly early on, before the advent of the cyclometer, by the mathematician-cryptologists of the Polish Cipher Bureau in decrypting the German Enigma machine
 Grill (jewelry), a form of dental jewelry commonly associated with hip hop
 Grill (philately), a pattern of indentations on a postage stamp
Grill, a verb meaning to interrogate someone
 Grille (artillery), a self-propelled artillery piece used by Germany during World War II
Grille (cryptography), a technique for encrypting a plaintext by writing it onto a sheet of paper through a pierced sheet
 Grille (car), an opening in the bodywork of a vehicle to allow air to enter
 "Grille", synonym of "register", "return" in HVAC system
 Grille (architecture), architectural element
 Grille, a decorative window Muntin for simulating separate panes
 Grillwork, decorative grating

See also 
 
 
 Teppanyaki